The family Proteidae is a group of aquatic salamanders found today in the Balkan Peninsula and North America.  The range of the genus Necturus (commonly known as waterdogs or mudpuppies) runs from southern central Canada, through the midwestern United States, east to North Carolina and south to Georgia and Mississippi.  The range of the olm, the only extant member of the genus Proteus, is limited to the Western Balkans. The fossil record of the family extends into the end of the Late Cretaceous, with Paranecturus being known from the Maastrichtian of North America.

Taxonomy 
Proteidae, is divided into two extant genera, Necturus with five North American species, and Proteus with one extant European species, the olm. A number of extinct genera are known extending back to the end of the Late Cretaceous.

Family Proteidae
 Genus Necturus
Alabama waterdog (N. alabamensis)
Western waterdog (N. beyeri)
Neuse River waterdog (N. lewisi)
Red River waterdog (N. louisianensis), sometimes considered a subspecies of N. maculosus
Common mudpuppy (N. maculosus)
Apalachicola waterdog (N. moleri)
Escambia waterdog (N. mounti)
Dwarf waterdog (N. punctatus)
 Genus Proteus
Olm (P. anguinus)
†P. bavaricus (became extinct during the Pleistocene)
 Genus †Euronecturus
 E. grogu (Miocene, Germany)
 Genus †Orthophyia
O. longa (Miocene species)
 Genus †Paranecturus
P. garbanii (Miocene species)
 Genus †Mioproteus
†Mioproteus caucasicus (Middle Miocene)
†M. wezei (Pliocene to Middle Pleistocene)

Life history
In contrast to many salamanders, proteids never lose their gills during maturation from larvae.  This aspect of their physiology is known as pedomorphosis.  Despite having lungs, which appear to provide little use in respiration, mudpuppies spend their entire lives underwater. The adult gills resemble fish gills in many ways, but differ from fish gills in that they are external and lack any form of operculum, or covering.  The bright red exposed gills are often found closed against the body in cool, highly oxygenated water.  In warmer, poorly oxygenated water, the gills expand to increase water circulation and provide greater surface area for oxygen intake. Necturus salamanders such as "mudpuppies" also absorb oxygen through their skin and by occasionally breathing air at the surface.

Other distinguishing features of proteid salamanders, as compared with other salamanders, are the absence of eyelids and a lack of maxillary bones in the upper jaw. They show a degree of parental care, tending to the eggs after attaching them to submerged stones and logs.

Members of the genus Necturus, commonly called "mudpuppies" or "waterdogs", prefer shallow lakes and streams that have slow moving water and rocks to hide under, but have been found in up to 90 feet of water.   Their name originates from the misconception that they make a dog-like barking sound. Diet consists of small fish and many invertebrates, including crayfish, snails, and worms. Mudpuppies mature at four to six years and can live to be more than twenty years old. Progenesis is common for mudpuppies, enabling them to reach sexual maturity in their larval stage.

Even though they eat fish eggs, negative effects on fish populations have not been documented.  Fishermen have been known to catch mudpuppies, sometimes in large numbers, but most often when ice fishing. Necturus salamanders also commonly feed on mollusks, worms, insects and small fish.

To distinguish between a larval mudpuppy and other larval salamanders, note that larval mudpuppies have distinct longitudinal banding and four toes on their hind legs, the combination of which is not found in most larval salamanders within the same range.  The main difference between a mudpuppy and a siren is that, whereas mudpuppies have both front and hind legs, a siren will only have one pair of very small, atrophied front legs.

See also
 Axolotl

References

External links

 Tree of Life: Proteidae

 
Salamandroidea
Amphibian families
Taxa named by John Edward Gray
Extant Maastrichtian first appearances